The Venetian publisher and bookseller Ferdinando Ongania (1842-1911) is best known for publishing the monumental edition Basilica San Marco. Ongania published more than 170 books, mainly about Venice. He was particularly significant for using the latest photographic techniques to create facsimile editions and reproductions of great Venetian artworks. In particular, his heliographic prints were remarkable for their clarity. He published out of his antique shop and gallery on Piazza San Marco, which catered to an international clientele.

References

1842 births
1911 deaths